Aleksandr Zakharov may refer to:

 Aleksandr Konstantinovich Zakharov (born 1987), Russian football (soccer) player
 Aleksandr Viktorovich Zakharov (born 1969), Soviet Russian football (soccer) player
 Alexander V. Zakharov (born 1941), Russian scientist
 Alexander Zakharov (basketball) (born 1993), Russian basketball player
 Aleksandr Zakharov (water polo) (born 1954), Soviet water polo player

See also
 Oleksandr Zakharov (born 1966), Soviet and Ukrainian professional footballer